Andrei Aleksandrovich Vshivtsev (born 25 January 1994) is a Russian football forward who plays for FC Delin Izhevsk.

Club career
He made his debut in the Russian Second Division for FC Rubin-2 Kazan on 18 April 2013 in a game against FC Nosta Novotroitsk.

References

External links
 Career summary by sportbox.ru
 
 
 

1994 births
Living people
Sportspeople from Izhevsk
Russian footballers
Association football forwards
FC Rubin Kazan players
FC Avangard Kursk players
FC Dnepr Mogilev players
Belarusian Premier League players
Russian expatriate footballers
Expatriate footballers in Belarus